Postallı   is a village in Bor district of Niğde Province, Turkey. Postallı pond an artificial pond for irrigation is to the northeast of the village. The population of Postallı  was 334 as of 2011.

References 

Villages in Bor District, Niğde